Pixley  may refer to:
Placenames
Pixley, California, USA
Pixley, Kansas, USA
Pixley, Herefordshire, England
Pixley, Shropshire, England
Pixley, Wyoming, USA
Pixley (Green Acres), fictional place in USA

Surname
 Francis W. Pixley (1852–1933), English accountant and author

Given Name
Pixley ka Isaka Seme (1881-1951), a founder and President of the African National Congress